, Air India operates a fleet of both narrow body and widebody aircraft with a fleet composed of Airbus A319, A320, A320neo, A321 as well as Boeing 777 and Boeing 787, making for a total of 113 aircraft.

Current fleet
, Air India operates the following aircraft:

Former fleet

Fleet Development

Fleet Information 
In 1932, Air India started operations with a de Havilland Puss Moth. It inducted its first Boeing 707-420 named Gauri Shankar (registered VT-DJJ), thereby becoming the first Asian airline to induct a jet aircraft in its fleet and on 4 August 1993, Air India took the delivery of its first Boeing 747-400 named Konark (registered VT-ESM). Apart from the Boeing aircraft, Air India also operates a wide range of Airbus aircraft. In 1989, Indian Airlines introduced the Airbus A320-200 aircraft, which Air India now uses to operate both domestic and international short haul flights. In 2005, Indian Airlines introduced smaller A319s, which are now used mainly on domestic and regional routes. After the merger in 2007, Air India inducted the biggest member of the A320 family, the A321, to operate mainly on international short haul and medium haul routes. At the same time, Air India leased Airbus A330s to operate on medium-long haul international routes. Currently Air India has many narrow body aircraft for domestic destinations like A320, A321 and A320 neo. Air India has also many wide body aircraft like Boeing 777-200LR, Boeing 777-300ER, Boeing 747-400 and Boeing 787-8 mainly for international destinations. Air India Express, a subsidiary of Air India has a fleet of 25 Boeing 737-800. On 17 June 2019, Air India grounded its last Airbus A320 classic fleet, which flown its last flight from Delhi to Mumbai.

Fleet Restructuring 
As a part of the financial restructuring, Air India sold five of its eight Boeing 777-200LR aircraft to Etihad Airways in December 2013. According to the airline, plans for introducing ultra-long flights with service to Seattle, San Francisco, and Los Angeles were cancelled due to factors like high fuel prices and weak demand. Air India flights to San Francisco have been resumed with more new international destinations. On 24 April 2014, Air India issued a tender for leasing 14 Airbus A320 aircraft for up to six years, to strengthen its domestic network. Air India has purchased many Boeing 787-8 Dreamliners to strengthen international operations.

Post Privatization 

In December 2022, a day after the announcement of the merger of Air India and Vistara, it was reported that Tata Sons are set to buy around 500 jets from Airbus and Boeing which would cost around 100 billion. The order includes around 400 narrow-body aircraft and around 100 wide-body aircraft including Airbus A350, Boeing 777 and Boeing 787. After the finalisation of this deal, it would be the biggest ever deal at once by a single airline, surpassing the deal of 460 jets by American Airlines with Airbus and Boeing.

On 14th February 2023, Air India announced an order for 470 aircraft with Airbus and Boeing. The order consists of 210 A320neo family aircraft, 40 A350, 190  737 MAX, 20 787-9 and 10 777-9 aircraft with deliveries beginning late 2023.

References

fleet
Lists of aircraft by operator